Gushiken or Gusicin is an Okinawan surname of Okinawan (Ryukyuan) origin. Often taken to mean "strong willed" or "of firm determination", a meaning taken from the combination of the three kanji characters in the name. Gu (具) means roughly ingredients/utensil/means, Shi (志) means will/motive/bear in mind, and Ken (堅) means hard/resolute/unyielding. This surname is rare among Japanese surnames in that it is one of the few that are composed of three kanji characters, where most Japanese surnames are either composed of one or two kanji characters.

The Gushiken surname is one of many family names of the Okinawan bureaucrat class (Okinawan scholar-officials, also known as Shizoku Pechin). In recent history there have been some notable Gushiken who have excelled in such fields as martial arts, politics, sports, education, and entertainment.

Some members of former-Scholars families began their migration from Okinawa in the early 20th century. Years earlier, in the late 19th century, government pensions to Samurai had been cancelled. Then, in 1920, Okinawa was hit hard by a major economic downturn. The price of cotton and silk fell by 70% in some areas and it was still recovering from a major epidemic that had swept through the islands. Many in the warrior class found the adjustment difficult and left Okinawa to seek their fortunes in places like Hawaii, Brazil, Peru, Mexico, and California.

See also
 Okinawan Scholar-officials - Pechin
 Yoko Gushiken (The Okinawan Eagle), WBA Jr. flyweight champion 1976-1981
 Koji Gushiken, 1984 Olympic AA Champion
 Kosei Gushiken (born 1942), Japanese triple jumper
 Luiz Gushiken (1950 - 2013), Brazilian politician
 Misaki Gushiken (born 1990), Japanese weightlifter

Japanese-language surnames
Okinawan surnames